RRAD may refer to:

Red River Army Depot, a depot-level maintenance facility located west of Texarkana, Texas
RRAD (gene), a protein that in humans is encoded by the RRAD gene